The When You Look Me in the Eyes Tour (or the Look Me in the Eyes Tour), sometimes stylized as the WYLMITE Tour, is the fourth tour by the Jonas Brothers and their second tour to promote their second album, Jonas Brothers. The opening act for the entire tour was Rooney, with Valora as a supporting opening act, as well as Jen Marks. The Look Me in the Eyes Tour started on January 31, 2008, and ended on March 22, 2008. It lasted for a total of 39 dates. During this time, the Jonas Brothers had also signed a two-year, multimillion-dollar worldwide touring deal with Live Nation.

Opening Acts
 Jen Marks
 Valora

Set list

"Year 3000"
"Just Friends"
"Australia"
"Goodnight and Goodbye"
"Hello Beautiful"
"Take a Breath"
"Underdog"
"Shelf"
"Pushin' Me Away"
"That's Just the Way We Roll"
"Games"
"Take on Me"
"Still in Love with You"
"Hollywood"
"Burnin' Up"
"When You Look Me in the Eyes"
"Hold On"
Encore
"A Little Bit Longer"
"S.O.S."

Tour dates

Box office score data

References

2008 concert tours
Jonas Brothers concert tours